"Love Is a Battlefield" is a 1983 American love song sung by Pat Benatar.

Love Is a Battlefield may also refer to:

 Love Is a Battlefield, the second book of the webcomic Erfworld, written by Rob Balder and illustrated by Xin Ye
 "Love Is a Battlefield", the first act of "Unconditional Love", an episode of This American Life hosted by Alix Spiegel
 Prom Wars: Love Is a Battlefield, a 2008 film starring Meaghan Rath

Music 

 Love Is a Battlefield, EP by Hi-Standard
 "Love Is a Battlefield", a song by CL Smooth from The Outsider

Television 
 "Love Is a Battlefield", an episode of Degrassi: The Next Generation
 "Love Is a Battlefield", an episode of Noah's Arc
 "Love Is a Battlefield", an episode of ER
 "Love Is a Battlefield", an episode of Green Lantern: The Animated Series
 "Love Is a Battlefield", an episode of The Challenge: Battle of the Exes
 "Love Is a Battlefield", an episode of Casualty
 "Love Is A Battlefield", an episode of The Flash

See also 
 Battlefield (disambiguation)